Shanty may refer to:

Buildings and developments
 Ice shanty, a portable shed placed on a frozen lake
 Shack or shanty, improvised housing, a type of primitive dwelling
 Shanty town, a settlement of shacks or shanties

Geography
 Shanty Bay, in the Oro-Medonte township in south-central Ontario, Canada
 Shanty Hollow Lake, a reservoir located in Warren County and Edmonson County, Kentucky

Music
 Sea shanty, a type of shipboard work-song
 "Shanty" (Jonathan Edwards song), 1971

Other uses
 Shanty Hogan (1906–1967), Major League Baseball catcher
 Shanty Irish, 19th and 20th century term to categorize poor Irish people, particularly Irish Americans
 Sly-grog shop or shanty, an Australian term for an unlicensed hotel or liquor-store
 Shanty, a character in the video game Them's Fightin' Herds.

See also 
 Shandy, beer mixed with a soft drink
 Shanti (disambiguation)